The Colorado Buffaloes football statistical leaders are individual statistical leaders of the Colorado Buffaloes football program in various categories, including passing, rushing, receiving, total offense, defensive stats, and kicking. Within those areas, the lists identify single-game, single-season, and career leaders. The Buffaloes represent the University of Colorado Boulder in the NCAA's Pac-12 Conference.

Although Colorado began competing in intercollegiate football in 1890, the school's official record book considers the "modern era" to have begun in 1930s. Records from before this year are often incomplete and inconsistent, and they are generally not included in these lists.

These lists are dominated by more recent players for several reasons:
 Since 1930s, seasons have increased from 10 games to 11 and then 12 games in length.
 The NCAA didn't allow freshmen to play varsity football until 1972 (with the exception of the World War II years), allowing players to have four-year careers.
 Bowl games only began counting toward single-season and career statistics in 2002. The Buffaloes have played in five bowl games since then, allowing players in those seasons an extra game to accumulate statistics.
 Similarly, the Buffaloes have appeared in the Big 12 Championship Game four times and the Pac-12 Championship Game once, giving players yet another game to accumulate stats.

These lists are updated through Colorado's game against California on October 28, 2017.

Passing

Passing yards

Passing touchdowns

Rushing

Rushing yards

Rushing touchdowns

Receiving

Receptions

Receiving yards

Receiving touchdowns

Total offense
Total offense is the sum of passing and rushing statistics. It does not include receiving or returns.

Total offense yards

Touchdowns responsible for
"Touchdowns responsible for" is the NCAA's official term for combined passing and rushing touchdowns.

Defense

Interceptions

Tackles

Sacks

Kicking

Field goals made

Field goal percentage

References

Colorado